Mumtaz Dughmush (ممتاز دغمش, also spelled Mumtaz Dogmosh) alias Abu Muhammad is the leader of the Palestinian militant group Jaish al-Islam and the head of the Dughmush clan in Gaza City.
He was formerly a member of the Hamas party.

External links 
 Observer article
 Jerusalem Post article
 BBC News article

Living people
Palestinian Islamists
Palestinian Sunni Muslims
Individuals designated as terrorists by the United States government
Year of birth missing (living people)